Madhavan Nair, commonly known by his stage name Madhu, is an Indian actor, director, producer, former college lecturer and former film studio owner, who works in Malayalam cinema and a certain number of Hindi and Tamil films. He was a prominent lead actor during the 1960s, 1970s and 1980s and has acted in more than 400 films. Madhu has also directed 12 films, produced 15 films and at one time owned the Uma Film Studio. He was awarded the Padma Shri by the Government of India in 2013 for his contributions towards the arts. He was honored with the J. C. Daniel Award by the Government of Kerala in 2004, for his outstanding contributions to Malayalam films. He is the president of Indian People's Theatre Association (IPTA) Kerala Unit.

Mini, a children's movie produced by him, bagged the Indira Gandhi National Award for Best Film on Family Welfare, at the 43rd National Film Awards in 1995.  He is the inaugural winner of the Filmfare Award for Best Actor – Malayalam for his performance in Swayamvaram (1972), and has received three more Filmfare awards and is also the recipient of five Kerala State Film Awards. Madhu starred Chemmeen won the President's Gold Medal for the All India Best Feature Film in 1965, becoming the first Malayalam film to win the title.

Personal life

He was born on 23 September 1933 at Gowreesapattom in the erstwhile Kingdom of Travancore. His father, R. Parameswaran Pillai (hailed from Padmanabhapuram, Thuckalay), was the erstwhile Mayor of Trivandrum and his mother Thankamma was a housewife. He has four sisters. He had his primary schooling up to the fourth standard at Kunnukuzhi L.P School, fifth class (preparatory) at S. M. V. School, 1st form to 3rd form at Pettah Middle School and fourth form to sixth form (SSLC) at St. Joseph's High School. He did pre university degree from Mahatma Gandhi College and graduation in Hindi from University College. He did his post graduation in Hindi from Banaras Hindu University (BHU).

He was married to Jayalakshmi till her death in 2014. They have a daughter Uma.<ref>{{cite news |title=Game again for arc lights, but its got to be different: Thespian Madhu (Where Are They Now?) |url=https://www.outlookindia.com/newsscroll/game-again-for-arc-lights-but-its-got-to-be-different-thespian-madhu-where-are-they-now/1584625 |access-date=17 August 2019 |work=Outlook |date=28 July 2019}}</ref>

Career
He started his career as a Hindi lecturer in S. T. Hindu College and then Scott Christian College at Nagercoil. During that time he chanced upon a newspaper advertisement inviting applications for the National School of Drama course. While studying at NSD, he became acquainted with Ramu Kariat, who offered him a role in his forthcoming film Moodupadam. After completing the course, Madhu went to Chennai to screen test for Karyat's film. While there, in 1963, he was offered a role in N. N. Pisharody's film, Ninamaninja Kalpadukal and this became his debut. In the movie, he portrayed Stephen, a brave soldier of the Indian army who sacrifices his life, on the battle field, for his motherland. The role and the movie were well received by the public. Moodupadam, for which he had come to Chennai for the make up test, became his second film. From thereon, there was no looking back.
He has expressed all facets of life through his various acting roles. Perhaps his most notable role during his early career, was in Kariat's Chemmeen, which won the President's Gold Medal. Madhu entered Malayalam cinema at a time when lead roles were dominated by actors like Prem Nazir and Sathyan and created a niche for himself. One of his early films where he made a mark was Bhargavi Nilayam, a suspense movie, where he is the only actor on screen during the first half of the movie. Followed by Udhyogastha, Virunnukari, and Veettu Mrugam, by P. Venu. Madhu has brought to life on screen, memorable characters from the works of eminent writers in Malayalam; Vaikom Muhammad Basheer, Thakazhi, P. Kesavadev, Uroob, Ponkunnam Varkey, S. K. Pottekkatt, Changampuzha, M. T. Vasudevan Nair, G. Vivekanandan, N. N. Pisharody and C. Radhakrishnan, to name a few.

In an acting career spanning over five decades, Madhu acted in over 370 films. Although he was a big star in commercial films, he was generous enough to act in parallel movies. He acted in Adoor Gopalakrishnan's Swayamvaram, P. N. Menon's Olavum Theeravum etc.

Madhu also proved his talents as a film maker and director. His first directorial venture Priya released in 1970, was a trend setter in Malayalam. The film won the Kerala Government award for the second best film that year. Madhu directed twelve movies including hit films like ‘Sindooracheppu’, ‘Manya Shree Vishwamitran’, ‘Neela Kannukal, ‘Akkaldama’, '''Kamam Krodham Moham’, ‘Theekanal’, ‘Dheerasameere Yamunathere’, ‘Aaradhana’, ‘Oru Yuga Sandhya’ and ‘Udayam Padinjaru’. He was the producer of most of these films. He produced fifteen movies including ‘Kaithapoo’, ‘Asthamayam’, ‘Shudhi Kalasham’, ‘Prabhatha Sandhya’, ‘Vaiki Vanna Vasantham’, ‘Archana Teacher’, ‘Grihalakshmi’, ‘Njan Ekananu’, ‘Rathilayam’ and Mini. He also produced and directed a movie in English ‘Sunrise in the West’, which was shot entirely in the USA. He was instrumental in introducing a number of talented actors, directors, lyricists, producers, singers and other technicians to the Malayalam filmdom.  He was the owner of once-renowned Uma studio at Puliyarakonam in Thiruvananthapuram. Mini produced by Madhu won the National Film Award for Best Film on Family Welfare, at the 43rd National Film Awards in 1995. The film focuses on the social issue of alcoholism.

Madhu was one of the lead actors in the Hindi film Saat Hindustani, which was the debut movie of the Bollywood actor Amitabh Bachchan in 1969. His other Hindi films are ‘Chakachak’ directed by Sai Paranjpye and Maiyya directed by Anil.

Madhu has also done three Tamil films, as Rajinikanth's father in Dharma Dorai, Oru Ponnu Oru Paiyan and Bharatha Vilas.

Filmography

Madhu has so far acted in more than 400 movies including Malayalam, Hindi and Tamil languages and directed 12 movies.

Accolades

 Civilian Awards 
 2013 Padma Shri

 National Film Award 
 1995 National Film Award for Best Film on Family Welfare for Mini (Produced by Madhu) in 1995 (Directed by P. Chandrakumar)

 Kerala State Film Award 
 2004 J. C. Daniel Award for Lifetime Achievement from the Government of Kerala.
 1995 Kerala State Film Award for Best Children's Film for Mini (Produced by Madhu) in 1995 (Directed by P. Chandrakumar)
 1992 Kerala State Film Award (Special Jury Award) in 1992 for Kudumbasametham
 1980 Kerala State Film Award (Special Jury Award) in 1980 for multiple films
 1971 Kerala State Film Award for Second Best Film for Sindooracheppu (Directed by Madhu) in 1971.
 1970 Kerala State Film Award for Second Best Film for Priya (Directed by Madhu) in 1970.

 Kerala Film Critics Association Awards
 1994 Chalachitra Ratnam Award for Lifetime Achievement
 1979 Kerala Film Critics Association Award for Best Actor for Idavazhiyile Poocha Minda Poocha
 1977 Kerala Film Critics Association Award for Best Actor for Yuddha Kandam, Itha Ivide Vare

 Filmfare Awards South 
 1994 Filmfare Lifetime Achievement Award – South (1994)
 1977 Filmfare Award for Best Actor – Malayalam – Yuddha Kaandam (1977)
 1976 Filmfare Award for Best Actor – Malayalam – Theekkanal (1976)
 1972 Filmfare Award for Best Actor – Malayalam – Swayamvaram (1972) (inaugural winner)

 Other awards 
 2013 Honored by the President of India during 100 years of Indian Cinema celebration held at Chennai
 2013 Honour from the Government of Kerala for completing 5 decades in Malayalam film industry
 2013 Honoured by AMMA (Association of Malayalam Movie Artists) for his contributions to the Malayalam film industry, spanning over 50 years
 2013 Honour from MACTA on completion of 50 years in Malayalam Cinema
 Award from Thunchath Ezhuthachan Malayalam University, in recognition of his contributions to Malayalam cinema
 MACTA Legends Honour Award
 Sathyan Award 2012
 Prem Nazir Foundation Award
 Ramu Kariat Award
 Dr. Sukumar Azhikode Award
 Thoppil Bhasi Smaraka Prathibha Puraskaram
 P. Bhaskaran Foundation Award
 Thilakan Foundation Award 
 Narendra Prasad Puraskaram
 Bahadoor Foundation Award in 2005
 Muthukulam Raghavan Pillai Memorial Award 
 Asianet Film Awards 2002 – Best Lifetime Achievement Award

References

External links

Official website

Profile in Malayalasangeetham.info
Madhu biography at keral.com

1933 births
Living people
Kerala State Film Award winners
Producers who won the Best Film on Family Welfare National Film Award
J. C. Daniel Award winners
20th-century Indian male actors
21st-century Indian male actors
Indian male film actors
Film directors from Thiruvananthapuram
Male actors from Thiruvananthapuram
Male actors in Malayalam cinema
Filmfare Awards South winners
Malayalam film producers
Recipients of the Padma Shri in arts
Film producers from Thiruvananthapuram
Indian male television actors
Tamil male television actors
Male actors in Malayalam television
Male actors in Telugu cinema
Male actors in Hindi cinema
20th-century Indian film directors
Malayalam film directors
Male actors in Telugu television